Arnstein may refer to:

 Arnstein, a town in Bavaria, Germany
 Arnstein Castle in Arnstein, Bavaria
 Arnstein, Saxony-Anhalt, a town in Saxony-Anhalt, Germany
 Arnstein Castle in Arnstein, Saxony-Anhalt
 Arnstein Abbey in Rhineland-Palatinate, Germany
 Arnstein Castle, Rhineland-Palatinate, predecessor of Arnstein Abbey
 Arnstein Castle in Ottendorf, Landkreis Sächsische Schweiz-Osterzgebirge, Saxony
 Arnstein Castle (Austria), 12th-century castle ruins in Austria
 Palais Arnstein, Vienna
 Arnstein Airport, Ontario
 Arnstein (personal name), a surname and a given name

See also

 Ornstein